Carmen James Cavezza  (born November 15, 1937) is a retired United States Army lieutenant general. He is a former commander of the I Corps at Fort Lewis, Washington, Commander at Fort Benning, Georgia, Commander at Fort Ord, California, Assistant Commander, 82nd Airborne Division and Commanding General, United States Army Infantry Center and School at Fort Benning, Georgia. Cavezza retired in 1994.

Cavezza attended The Citadel, The Military College of South Carolina, graduating in 1961 with a B.A. degree in political science. He later earned an M.A. degree in government from the University of Miami, an M.S. degree in international affairs from the Elliott School of International Affairs and a Ph.D. degree in political science from George Washington University.

Cavezza was inducted into the U.S. Army Ranger Hall of Fame in 2010.

References

1937 births
Living people
People from Scranton, Pennsylvania
The Citadel, The Military College of South Carolina alumni
United States Army Rangers
United States Army personnel of the Vietnam War
Recipients of the Air Medal
Recipients of the Distinguished Flying Cross (United States)
Recipients of the Silver Star
University of Miami alumni
Elliott School of International Affairs alumni
George Washington University alumni
Recipients of the Meritorious Service Medal (United States)
Recipients of the Legion of Merit
United States Army generals
Recipients of the Distinguished Service Medal (US Army)